The Presbyterian Youth Connection is for all Presbyterian Church (U.S.A.) Youth and Adults. “Youth” is loosely defined as young people between the ages of 12 and 18.  It is a common identity, theology, and structure for youth ministry across the Presbyterian Church and is based on a model that envisions youth and adults working together towards common ministry concerns and goals.  It was founded at Presbyterian Youth Triennium and the General Assembly meeting in July 1995. It is the first youth ministry organization for the Presbyterian Church (U.S.A.).

History                   

The Presbyterian Youth Connection grew out of an overture from congregations in the Wyoming presbytery asking for a way to connect young people to each other across the Church. The General Assembly approved the overture and directed the National Presbyterian Youth Ministry Council to begin plans for a new youth ministry organization. What developed was a triennial meeting that models the General Assembly of the PC (USA). Parliamentary procedure is used during all work sessions. Participants meet in various places around the country and, during the course of each meeting, elect two co-moderators to serve over the next three years.

Logo
  

The Presbyterian Youth Connection logo is made up of several different symbols. The “hands” signify the partnership between local congregations, presbyteries and synods/regions, and are surrounded by a circle representing the General Assembly. The hands reach towards one another and towards the central dove, which is the Holy Spirit.

Intentions and mission statement
The five intentions of the Presbyterian Youth Connection are:-

 To call young people to be disciples of Jesus Christ.
 To respond to the needs and the interests of young people. 
 To work together, youth and adults, in partnership. 
 To be connected to the whole church, community, and the world. 
 To include all young people, reaching out, and inviting them to belong to the community of faith. 

The Presbyterian Youth Connection Mission Statement is:

As youth and adults,
We respond to God’s call through
The Holy Spirit
To be connected to each other, and the world
So that our lives proclaim with joy that Jesus Christ is Lord!

External links
Youth Ministry website

Christian youth organizations
Presbyterian organizations established in the 20th century